Tapiche District is one of eleven districts of the province Requena in Peru.

References

Districts of the Requena Province
Districts of the Loreto Region